Halgerda terramtuentis is a species of sea slug, a dorid nudibranch, shell-less marine gastropod mollusks in the family Discodorididae.

Distribution
This species was described from Hawaii.

Additional information
Sea Slugs of Hawaii: Halgerda terramtuentis main page

References

Discodorididae
Gastropods described in 1982